Longsmith Street is a street in Gloucester that runs from Bearland in the north to Southgate Street in the south.

The street includes a number of listed buildings:
 2 Longsmith Street & 28 Southgate Street
 4 Longsmith Street
 Bearland House
 Bearland Lodge
 Gloucester Crown Court, part of the Shire Hall complex designed by Robert Smirke.
 Ladybellegate House

References

External links 

Streets in Gloucester